Le Lycée Razi, translated in English as Razi High School, was a French-language co-ed school located on Pahlavi Street (now renamed Valiasr Street after the revolution of 79 ) in Tehran, Iran. The school is named after Razi a Persian physician, philosopher, and scholar. The first Razi school was built during the 1950s in a different area of the city of Teheran, and at the beginning of the 60s a new campus was built north of Vanak Square in Teheran.

Prior to the 1979 Revolution, the school was one of two French-language schools in Tehran along with Lycée Jeanne d'Arc. In contrast to the more rigiorous and religious association at Jeanne d'Arc, Razi was associated with upper-middle class families in Tehran due to the fact that members of the Shah's family attended the school.

Notable alumni
 Farah Pahlavi, the last empress of Iran.
 Ali Reza Pahlavi II, 1976 - younger son of Mohammad Reza Pahlavi, the Shah of Iran, and his wife Farah.
 Lily Amir-Arjomand, former leader of the Institute for Intellectual Development of Children and Young Adults and founder of the children's public library system in Iran
 Fereydoun Farrokhzad, Iranian singer and show anchor
 Arash Hejazi, Iranian British author and the witness in death of Neda Agha Soltan
 Marjane Satrapi, Graphic novelist, film director

See also 
Alavi Institute
 Firouz Bahram High School
 Alborz High School

References

External links

  بچه هایی رازی در فیس بوک...RAZI SCHOOL
  *https://www.facebook.com/schoolrazi'''''

High schools in Iran
Educational institutions established in 1950
Schools in Tehran
1950 establishments in Iran